Pic Verdaguer or Pic de Verdaguer is a mountain of the Montcalm Massif.

This mountain is included in the Parc Natural de l'Alt Pirineu together with Pica d'Estats and Punta Gabarró.

See also
List of Pyrenean three-thousanders

References

External links
 Pica d'Estats route through Canalbona. Includes Pic Verdaguer

Mountains of Catalonia
Mountains of the Pyrenees